Electrochemical Energy Reviews is a peer-reviewed scientific journal by Springer Nature. It is published on a quarterly basis. It was established in 2018 and is currently edited by Jiujun Zhang and Xueliang Andy Sun.

Abstracting and indexing 
The journal is abstracted and indexed in:
Compendex
DOAJ 
Science Citation Index Expanded
Scopus

According to the Journal Citation Reports, the journal has a 2020 impact factor of 28.905.

References

External links 
 

English-language journals
Quarterly journals
Hybrid open access journals
Publications established in 2018
Electrochemistry journals
Springer Science+Business Media academic journals